RING finger protein 139, also known as TRC8, is a protein that in humans is encoded by the RNF139 gene.

The protein encoded by this gene is a multi-membrane spanning protein containing a RING-H2 finger. This protein is located in the endoplasmic reticulum, and has been shown to possess ubiquitin ligase activity. This gene was found to be interrupted by a t(3:8) translocation in a family with hereditary renal and non-medullary thyroid cancer. Studies of the Drosophila counterpart suggested that this protein may interact with tumor suppressor protein VHL, as well as with  COPS5/JAB1, a protein responsible for the degradation of tumor suppressor CDKN1B/P27KIP].

References

Further reading

RING finger proteins